Qomsheh-ye Seyyed Amin (also Romanized as Qomsheh-ye Seyyed Amīn) is a village in Mahidasht Rural District, Mahidasht District, Kermanshah County, Kermanshah Province, Iran. At the 2006 census, its population was 35, in 10 families.

References 

Populated places in Kermanshah County